Gisagara Thermal Power Station is an , peat-fired thermal power plant, under construction in Gisagara District, in the  Southern Province of Rwanda.

Location

Overview
Hakan Mining and Generation Industry & Trade Inc., a Turkish Independent Power Producer, won the rights to build an 80 MW peat power plant in Gisagara District, Southern Rwanda.

In 2016, Hakan signed a power purchase agreement (PPA) with the government of Rwanda to design, finance, build, own and operate the plant using peat extracted from Akanyaru in Gisagara District. Rwanda would in turn buy the power generated and integrate it into the national electricity grid.

The  Gisagara Peat Power Plant will complement the  Gishoma Thermal Power Station, which came online in 2017.

Budget and timetable
Hakan will finance the estimated US$400 million (Rwf300 billion) project. Construction began in 2017 and completion was expected in 2020. Other credible sources have put the construction budget at US$350 million.

In August 2020, Rwandan print media reported that overall progress of development of the power station was estimated at 96.7 percent, with completion anticipated in April 2021. In January 2021 Taarifa Rwanda, an online publication, indicated that the power station was expected to come online in February 2021. The cost of the development is reported as US$350 million.

Developers
The power station was developed and is currently owned by a consortium comprising (a) Hakan AS, a Turkish solid fuel company (coal, peat etc.) (b) Quantum Power, an International power company and (c) Themis, a project development company. The consortium has developed a special purpose vehicle (SPV) company, HQ Power Rwanda. The owner developers have signed a power purchase agreement to construct, operate, maintain and own the power station for 26 years from date of commissioning and to sell the electricity generated to the Rwandan electricity utility company. Ownership of the power plant will then revert to the Government of Rwanda.

Funding
, the funding for this project included the following:

See also
List of power stations in Rwanda

References

External links
 Rwanda in power diversification bid
 Rwanda gets first peat-fired power plant in Africa As at 18 April 2017.
 List of Stakeholders In Gisagara Thermal Power Station As of 21 January 2021.

Peat-fired power stations in Rwanda
Southern Province, Rwanda